C alternative tokens refer to a set of alternative spellings of common operators in the C programming language. They are implemented as a group of macro constants in the C standard library in the iso646.h header. The tokens were created by Bjarne Stroustrup for the pre-standard C++ language and were added to the C standard in a 1995 amendment to the C90 standard via library to avoid the breakage of existing code.

The alternative tokens allow programmers to use C language bitwise and logical operators which could otherwise be hard to type on some international and non-QWERTY keyboards. The name of the header file they are implemented in refers to the ISO/IEC 646 standard, a 7-bit character set with a number of regional variations, some of which have accented characters in place of the punctuation marks used by C operators.

The macros 
The iso646.h header defines the following 11 macros as stated below:

C++ 
The above-mentioned identifiers are operator keywords in the ISO C++ programming language and do not require the inclusion of a header file. For consistency, the C++98 standard provides the header <ciso646>. However the latter file has no effect, being empty. Some compilers, such as Microsoft Visual C++ have, at least in the past, required the header to be included in order to use these identifiers unless a compiler flag is set.

See also 

 Digraphs and trigraphs in C

References

External links 
 

C (programming language)